Michajlov is a village and municipality in Snina District in the Prešov Region of north-eastern Slovakia.

History
In historical records the village was first mentioned in 1557 AD.

Geography
The municipality lies at an altitude of 250 metres and covers an area of 4.673 km2. It has a population of about 110 people.

References

External links
 
https://web.archive.org/web/20071027094149/http://www.statistics.sk/mosmis/eng/run.html

Villages and municipalities in Snina District
Zemplín (region)